Law of the Jungle is a South Korean reality-documentary show that airs on SBS. Each episode features celebrities sent to survive in remote locations around the world. The show was first aired on October 21, 2011. The show's 300th episode aired in 2018.

History
South Korean comedian Kim Byung-man created the Kim Byung-man's Law of the Jungle in 2011. On the show, celebrities, including actors and K-pop artists, join him in remote locations around the world to experience living in the wild. In each location, the guests are tasked to hunt, prepare meals, and create shelter for the group. Kim is the show's only regular cast member.

Kim did not appear on the show's 2017 episodes in Fiji after he suffered a spinal fracture while skydiving in the United States. He returned to the show for the following season in the Cook Islands.

The show first aired on Fridays at 11:05 pm KST on broadcast network SBS. On May 6, 2012, the show moved to Sundays at 5:00 pm. The show returned to Fridays on November 16, 2012, airing at 10:00 pm. The show moved to Saturday at 9:00 pm and shrank to 60 minutes starting from February 16, 2019.

Special editions of the show air occasionally. Law of the Jungle W features an all-female cast and generally airs during the Seollal and Chuseok holidays. Law of the Jungle K featured celebrities with their children, and aired as a Korean New Year special in 2013.

On May 26, 2020, SBS confirmed that the show would go on a hiatus due to the COVID-19 pandemic, which made travelling to foreign countries for filming of the show impossible.

The program rebooted on August 29, 2020 with the first domestic filming in the history, called "Law of the Jungle in Wild Korea".

List of episodes

Special editions
Law of the Jungle special editions generally aired during the Seollal and Chuseok holidays. It may be Law of the Jungle W (W for Women, features an all-female cast, except in the 4-Part Special), or Law of the Jungle K (K for Kids, features celebrities with their children), or another theme.

Ratings 
In the ratings below, the highest rating for each year will be in red, and the lowest rating for each year will be in blue.

2011

2012

2013

2014

2015

2016

2017

2018 

Remark
 April 27, 2018: Not airing due to special news broadcast of the April 2018 inter-Korean summit.
 November 23, 2018: Not airing due to live broadcast of the 39th Blue Dragon Film Awards.

2019

2020

2021

Specials

Awards and nominations

References

External links 
  

Law of the Jungle (TV series)
Seoul Broadcasting System original programming
South Korean variety television shows
2011 South Korean television series debuts
2021 South Korean television series endings
Television productions suspended due to the COVID-19 pandemic